Kargil Chowk is a War memorial. It was established in year 2000, at the North-East corner of Gandhi Maidan, Patna. It is dedicated to the soldiers from Bihar & Jharkhand who had sacrificed their lives in the Kargil War in 1999.

List engraved names on Kargil Chowk
Following are the martyrs whose names are engraved on Kargil Chowk war memorial.
 Major Chandrabhushan Divedi
 General Digambar Dixit, Palamu
 General Prabhakar Kumar Singh, Bhagalpur
 Nayak Ganesh Prasad Yadav, Patna
 Lance Naik Rambachan Rai, Vaishali
 Lance Naik Vidyanand Singh, Bhojpur
 Naik Bishuni Rai, Saran
 Naik Subedar Nageshwar Mahato, Ranchi
 Naik Neeraj Kumar, Lakhisarai
 Naik Sunil Kumar Singh, Muzaffarpur
 Havaldar Ratan Kumar Singh, Bhagalpur
 Sepoy Hardeo Prasad Singh, Nalanda
 Sepoy Rambhu Singh, Siwan
 Sepoy Arvind Kumar Pandey, Poorvi Champaran
 Sepoy Pramod Kumar, Poorvi Champaran
 Sepoy Arvind Kumar Pandey, Poorvi Champaran
 Sepoy Raman Kumar Jha, Saharsa
 Sepoy Harikrishna Ram, Siwan

In popular culture
Of late Kargil Chowk has witnessed several candle light marches by the general public to pay homage, to protest and to demand justice.

See also

Kargil (disambiguation)
Kargil War
Bihar Regiment

References

External links
 Kargil Martyrs Remembered

Kargil War
Indian military memorials and cemeteries
Tourist attractions in Patna
Buildings and structures in Patna
Monuments and memorials in Bihar